Memorial to Maria Raggi is a sculptural monument designed and executed by the Italian artist Gian Lorenzo Bernini, started in 1647 and finished in 1653. The monument is attached to a pillar in a nave of the church of Santa Maria sopra Minerva in Rome.

Maria Raggi
Maria Raggi (1552–1600) was a nun from the island of Chios. Forced to marry at an early age, she was widowed when her husband was captured by Turkish forces in 1570. She became a nun in 1571, and departed for Rome in 1584, where she was resident at the Palazzo of the de Marini family, near Santa Maria sopra Minerva. An extremely pious woman, she spent much of her day in prayer, and reportedly continually performed miracles. After dying in 1600, there was some possibility of her being canonised, but the general antipathy of Pope Urban VIII to such events meant the opportunity passed.

Patronage
Three descendants of Maria were responsible for commissioning Bernini to create the work, Ottaviano, Tommaso, and Lorenzo Raggi, whose names are noted in the Latin inscriptions in the bottom half of the memorial.

See also 
List of works by Gian Lorenzo Bernini

Notes

References

Further reading

 Ackermann, Felix. "Draperien in Stein", La soupe et les nuages, Etudes de lettres 254 (1999/3-4), pp. 7–26.

External links
 

Sculptures by Gian Lorenzo Bernini
Monuments and memorials in Rome
1640s sculptures
1650s sculptures
Bronze sculptures in Rome